Al-Malikiyya was a Palestinian village located in the Jabal Amil region. In a 1920s census, the village was registered as part of Greater Lebanon.  It was later placed under the British Mandate of Palestine. Its population was mostly Metawali Shiite.

In a 1930s census, the village was registered as Palestinian and part of the Safed District. The village was depopulated as a result of the 1948 Arab–Israeli War.

History
According to the Arab geographer Yaqut al-Hamawi (d. 1228), the people of al-Malikiyya had a wooden platter that they believed was originally owned by the prophet Mohammed.

Ottoman era
In 1596, al-Malikiyya was a village in the Ottoman nahiya (subdistrict) of Tibnin  under the liwa' (district) of Safad, with a population of 369. It paid taxes on a number of crops, such as wheat, barley, as well as goats and beehives.

Victor Guérin visited in 1875,  and noted that Al-Malkiyya had 300 Metawali inhabitants. He further noted that the village, which stood upon a lofty summit, was remarkable for possessing neither well nor cistern; the women fetched their water from the spring at Kades. But a birkeh was placed on the map close to the village.

In 1881, the PEF's Survey of Western Palestine (SWP)  described Al-Malkiyya as being built of stone and adobe, lying on a plain to the east of a valley. Well supplied with water from a nearby wadi, the village's 200-300 inhabitants cultivated olives.

British Mandate era
In the 1931 census of Palestine, conducted by the British Mandate authorities, El Malikiya had a population of 254, all Muslims, in 48 houses.

The population was 360 Muslims in the 1945 statistics, with a total of 7,328 dunams of land. A total of 4,225 dunums were allocated to cereals, while 55 dunams were classifies as built-up land.

1948 Arab-Israeli war, aftermath
Al-Malikiyya changed hands no fewer than five times between May and October 1948.

A battle was fought in the village on 5–6 June 1948. Combatants were Israelis and the Lebanese army commanded by Said Nasrallah, who would go on to become chief of staff of the Lebanese Armed Forces, along with Colonel El Sheikh Fawaz Kais.  The Lebanese army would occupy the village for a month till clashes erupted again with the Israeli army attacking. However, the Lebanese Army were able to hold their positions, until the Lebanese Army was ordered to retreat due to threats from foreign countries. However, Colonel Kais did not adhere to orders and ordered his platoon to hold position as he believed the situation was under control and his troops were able to defend the town. Other platoons stationed in the town  retreated after receiving the order, leaving solely Colonel Kais' platoon to fight against the Israeli Army. After heavy clashes, and the Lebanese Army losing positions quickly due to the retreat of the rest of the platoons, Colonel Kais' ordered the retreat of his platoon to avoid casualties. This was the only time Lebanon directly participated in the war.

As a result of the war, the village was depopulated.

In 1949, a kibbutz, Malkiya, was set up on village lands.

See also
Depopulated Palestinian locations in Israel
Metawali
Operation Hiram
Shia villages in Palestine

References

Bibliography

External links
Welcome to al-Malikiyya
al-Malikiyya, Zochrot
al-Malikiyya,  Dr. Khalil Rizk.
Survey of Western Palestine, Map 4: IAA, Wikimedia commons 
al-Malikiyya, from the Khalil Sakakini Cultural Center

Arab villages depopulated during the 1948 Arab–Israeli War
District of Safad